Ozerki is a rural locality (a selo) and the administrative center of Ozerskoye Rural Settlement, Buturlinovsky District, Voronezh Oblast, Russia. The population was 742 as of 2010. There are 6 streets.

Geography 
Ozerki is located 22 km north of Buturlinovka (the district's administrative centre) by road. Orlovka is the nearest rural locality.

References 

Rural localities in Buturlinovsky District